= Shorouq Al Sowaidi =

Qatari golfer

Shorouq Al Sowaidi is a Qatari golfer, who pioneered women's golf in Qatar.

Shorouq Al Sowaidi started playing golf in 2004, practicing under the auspices of the Qatar Golf Association. In 2006 she represented Qatar at the 2006 Asian Games in Doha, where she finished last in the women's individual competition.
